Genouilly may refer to the following places in France:

Genouilly, Cher, a commune in the department of Cher
Genouilly, Saône-et-Loire, a commune in the department of Saône-et-Loire